Casa de los Babys ("House of the Babies") is a 2003 drama film written, directed, and edited by filmmaker John Sayles.  It features an ensemble cast, including Marcia Gay Harden, Maggie Gyllenhaal and Daryl Hannah.

Plot
The film tells the story of six white American women, impatiently waiting out their lengthy residency requirements in an unidentified South American country before picking up their adoptive babies.

Cast
 Marcia Gay Harden as Nan, a bullying know-it-all who tries to get her lawyer to put her at the top of the baby list by way of bribery.
 Maggie Gyllenhaal as Jennifer, a well-to-do partner of a conservative husband who has decreed that his adoptive son will carry on his name.
 Daryl Hannah as Skipper, a Colorado girl who is an exercise fanatic and a masseuse. She has lost three babies due to birth defects.
 Susan Lynch as Eileen, a tender-hearted Irish American who dreams out loud about spending an enchanted snow day with her daughter in Boston.
 Mary Steenburgen as Gayle, a recovering alcoholic and born again Christian.
 Lili Taylor as Leslie, a single New Yorker who works in publishing, speaks fluent Spanish, and rebuffs a teenage beach boy.
 Rita Moreno as Señora Muñoz
 Martha Higareda as Celia
 Vanessa Martinez as Asunción

Reception

Box-office and distribution
The film was first presented at the Venice Film Festival on September 5, 2003.

The film was screened at various film festivals, including the Toronto International Film Festival, Canada; the Istanbul FilmOctober Film Week, Turkey; and others.

It opened both in New York City and Los Angeles on September 19, 2003. The first week's gross was $36,456 (nine screens) and the total receipts for the run were $475,940. In its widest release the film was featured in 71 theaters. The motion picture was in circulation 10 weeks.

Critical response
Critic Stephen Holden, writing for The New York Times, liked the film message and wrote, "Casa de los Babys, adheres to the same essayistic format as many of its forerunners...Despite its emotionally loaded theme, the film is a scrupulously suds-free examination of motherhood as it is viewed in first- and third-world countries. The closest it gets to misty-eyed is in its panoramic shots of wide-eyed Latino infants who will soon be transported from a nation mired in poverty to a land of plenty ... the movie's even-handed portrayal of two cultures uneasily transacting the most personal business resonates with truth."

Critic Roger Ebert lauded the film and wrote, "Sayles handles this material with gentle delicacy, as if aware that the issues are too fraught to be approached with simple messages. He shows both sides; the maid Asuncion gave up her baby and now imagines her happy life in El Norte, but we feel how much she misses her. The squeegee kids on the corner have been abandoned by their parents and might happily go home with one of these rich Americanas. Sayles sees like a documentarian, showing us the women, listening to their stories, inviting us to share their hopes and fears and speculate about their motives. There are no answers here, just the experiences of waiting for a few weeks in the Casa de los Babys."

Critics Frederic and Mary Ann Brussat also liked the film's message and wrote, "The overall tone of Casa de los Babys promotes the spiritual practice of openness, which is the ability to see clearly, without preference or prejudice, and with empathy. Sayles continues his special mission of exploring the nuances that go into the creation of cross-cultural tensions and misunderstandings."

References

External links
 
 
 
 

2003 films
2003 comedy-drama films
American comedy-drama films
2000s English-language films
Films directed by John Sayles
2003 independent films
Films set in South America
Films shot in Mexico
IFC Films films
Films with screenplays by John Sayles
2000s Spanish-language films
Films about adoption
Films scored by Mason Daring
2003 multilingual films
American multilingual films
Mexican multilingual films
2000s American films